Robert Moses State Park can refer to two state parks in New York:

Robert Moses State Park (Long Island) on Fire Island, on the southern shore of Long Island 
Robert Moses State Park (Thousand Islands) on the Saint Lawrence River in northern New York